Bacova Junction is an unincorporated community in Bath County, Virginia, in the United States. 
Historically, Bacova Junction was known for its timber industry.

History
Bacova Junction was known historically as Grose. Grose house, known as Thornhill House, still exists and is situated at Queen Springs, along Cowardin Run, near the community. The Warwickton plantation was built by Judge James Woods Warwick in the 1850s. The house was restored by Ron and Pam Stidham in the 1890s.

Geography
Virginia State Route 615 and Virginia State Route 687 converge at the community.

Economy
Bacova Junction lay along the Chesapeake and Ohio railroad and was known for its timber production, with over 30,000 acres in the vicinity.

References

Unincorporated communities in Bath County, Virginia
Unincorporated communities in Virginia